This Ain't No Mixtape is the debut studio album by American rapper Curren$y. It was released digitally on April 21, 2009, while it was released physically on June 28, 2011, by Amalgam Digital. The entire album was produced by Monsta Beatz. Following the release, Curren$y has released a series of highly touted mixtapes. For the hence of the album's title, along with the album cover has taken its inspiration from the video game Grand Theft Auto: Vice City (2002).

Track listing
 All tracks produced by Monsta Beatz.

References

2009 debut albums
Currensy albums